Ranne is a surname. Notable people with the surname include:

G. E. Ranne, French writer
Lulu Ranne (born 1971), Finnish politician
Tiina Ranne (born 1994), Finnish ice hockey player